Jane Forth (born March 4, 1953) is an American actress and model, best known for having been one of the Warhol superstars, starring in films such as Trash, and being one of “Antonio’s Girls”, models and muses of fashion illustrator Antonio Lopez.

Early years
Forth dropped out of high school and, with her family, left St. Claire Shores, Michigan, when she was 15 to go to New York.

Career
She started her career as a receptionist at Andy Warhol's Factory. Forth met Warhol through her first boyfriend, Jay Johnson—the twin brother of Warhol’s long-time partner, Jed Johnson.

In July 1970, she was on the cover of Life. She had just turned 17 when Jack Mitchell photographed her for the mostly nude four-page photo spread. Her unique look, involving plucked eyebrows, Wesson-oiled hair, pale skin, red cheeks, and bold lips, was pronounced the “New Now Face” in 1970. Inspired by classic Hollywood heroines, such as Myrna Loy and Claudette Colbert, she styled herself in thrifted clothing from the 1930s and ‘40s.

Taken with her striking appearance, Warhol invited Forth to perform in Trash (1970) with Joe Dallesandro and Holly Woodlawn. Despite her youth, Forth shined in the production.

Rapidly launched into the worlds of fashion and film, Forth posed for Antonio Lopez’s fashion illustrations in the New York Times and was photographed for Vogue and Harper’s Bazaar. The youth and arrogance of then-teenaged Forth shows through her 1970 statement to Vogue: “When I’m home I’m yelling at my mother to iron my clothes, and when I’m out, I’m standing around yawning at all these fancy people”. She declared in the same interview that she bought dime-store make up and each of her “dress-up faces” only cost twenty five cents, with her thrifted vintage dresses averaging a price of $12.50. After appearing in Women In Revolt (1971), she was cast in Warhol’s next production, L’Amour (1972) alongside fellow Warhol superstar Donna Jordan.

After retiring from acting, she moved into film, make-up, and special effects.

Personal life
Forth was married to the English director of photography Oliver Wood for 22 years, and they have two daughters.

Selected filmography
 Trash (1970) - Jane
 Women in Revolt (1971) - Jane
 L'Amour (1973) - Jane
 Andy Warhol's Bad (1977) - Screaming Passer-by
 The Prowler (1981) - makeup artist

References

External links 
 

1953 births
American female models
20th-century American actresses
American film actresses
Living people
People associated with The Factory
Date of birth missing (living people)
Place of birth missing (living people)